John Harvard (16071638) was an English dissenting minister in Colonial America whose
deathbed
bequest to the

founded two years earlier by the Massachusetts Bay Colony was so gratefully received that it was consequently ordered 
"that the

agreed upon formerly to

built at

called Harvard." Harvard University considers him the most honored of its founders—those whose efforts and contributions in its early days "ensure[d] its permanence"—and a statue in his honor is a prominent feature of Harvard Yard.

Life

Early life

Harvard was born and raised in Southwark, Surrey, England, (now part of London), the fourth of nine children of Robert Harvard (1562–1625), a butcher and tavern owner, and his wife Katherine Rogers (1584–1635), a native of Stratford-upon-Avon. Her father, Thomas Rogers (1540–1611), served on the borough corporation's council with John Shakespeare. Harvard was baptised in St Saviour's Church (now Southwark Cathedral) and attended St Saviour's Grammar School, where his father was a member of the governing body and a warden of the parish church. His grandparents' house in Stratford-upon-Avon, largely rebuilt after a fire of 1595, survives as 'Harvard House'.

In 1625, bubonic plague reduced the immediate family to only John, his brother Thomas, and Katherine. Katherine was soon remarriedfirstly in 1626 to John Elletson (1580–1626), who died within a few months, then (1627) to Richard Yearwood (1580–1632). She died in 1635, Thomas in 1637.

Left with some property,
Harvard's mother was able to send him to the University of Cambridge, He was admitted as a pensioner to Emmanuel College, Cambridge on 19 December 1627; he was awarded his B.A. in 1632 and M.A. in 1635. He subsequently ministered in the church at Charlestown, though it is not known whether he was ever episcopally ordained.

Marriage and career
On 19 April of either 1636 or 1637, Harvard married Ann Sadler (1614–55) of Patcham in East Sussex, sister of his college contemporary John Sadler, at St Michael the Archangel Church, in the parish of South Malling, Lewes.

In the spring or summer of 1637, the couple emigrated to New England, where Harvard became a freeman of Massachusetts and, settling in Charlestown, a teaching elder of the First Church there and an assistant preacher. In 1638, a tract of land was deeded to him there, and he was appointed that same year to a committee "to consider of some things tending toward a body of laws."

He built his house on Country Road (later Market Street and now Main Street), next to Gravel Lane, a site that is now John Harvard Mall. His orchard extended up the hill behind his house.

Founding of Harvard College

Two years before Harvard's death the Great and General Court of the Massachusetts Bay Colonydesiring to "advance learning and perpetuate it to posterity: dreading to leave an illiterate ministry to the churches, when our present ministers shall lie in the dust"appropriated £400 toward a "schoale or colledge" at what was then called Newtowne.
In an oral will spoken to his wife the childless Harvard, who had inherited considerable sums from his father, mother, and brother,
bequeathed to the school £780half of his monetary estate (equivalent to £ today)  with the remainder to his wife.
This bequest was roughly equal to the Massachusetts Bay Colony's annual tax receipts.

Perhaps more importantly he also gave his scholar's library comprising some 329 titles (totaling 400 volumes, some titles being multivolume works).
In gratitude, it was subsequently ordered "that the

agreed upon formerly to

built at

called Harvard."
(Even before Harvard's death, Newtowne had been renamed Cambridge, after the English university attended by many early colonists, including Harvard himself.)

Death
On 14 September 1638, Harvard died of tuberculosis and was buried at Charlestown's Phipps Street Burying Ground. In 1828, Harvard University alumni erected a granite monument to his memory there, his original stone having disappeared during the American Revolution.

Harvard's widow, Ann, is thought to have married Thomas Allen, his successor as the teacher of the Charlestown church. Allen acted as administrator in the execution of Harvard's estate and paid his bequests.

Legacy

Founding "myth"
As quoted by the Harvard Magazine: "Smartass" tour guides,
and the Harvard College undergraduate newspaper, The Harvard Crimson,
commonly assert that John Harvard does not merit the honorific founder, because the Colony's vote had come two years prior to Harvard's bequest.
But as detailed in a 1934 letter by Jerome Davis Greene, Secretary of the Harvard Corporation, the founding of Harvard College was not the act of one but the work of many; John Harvard is therefore considered not the founder, but rather afounder, of the schoolthough the timeliness and generosity of his contribution have made him the most honored of these:

Memorials and tributes

A statue in Harvard's honor—not, however, a 'likeness' of him, there being nothing to indicate what he had looked like—is a prominent feature of Harvard Yard (see John Harvard statue) and was featured on a 1986 stamp, part of the United States Postal Service's Great Americans series. A figure representing him also appears in a stained-glass window in the chapel of Emmanuel College, Cambridge.

The John Harvard Library in Southwark, London, is named in Harvard's honor, as is the Harvard Bridge that connects Boston to Cambridge.

In Southwark Cathedral, the Harvard Chapel in the north transept was rebuilt with donations from Harvard graduates and dedicated in 1907. The stained-glass  window was designed by the American artist, John La Farge and given by the US Ambassador, Joseph Choate.

References

Further reading

External links

 

1607 births
1638 deaths
17th-century Calvinist and Reformed Christians
17th-century English clergy
17th-century American people
17th-century deaths from tuberculosis
Alumni of Emmanuel College, Cambridge
English Dissenters
English philanthropists
Harvard University people
People educated at St Saviour's Grammar School
People from Southwark
Burials in Boston
University and college founders
Kingdom of England emigrants to Massachusetts Bay Colony
17th-century philanthropists
Tuberculosis deaths in Massachusetts